Mundy is a surname of multiple origins. If of Norman origin, it is believed to have derived from Mondaye, which is the name of an abbey in Juaye-Mondaye, Normandy. The surname can also be of Irish origin (an anglicised version of 'Mac Giolla Eoin')

Notable persons with that surname include:
 Alfred Miller Mundy (1809–1877), English Army officer and politician in colonial South Australia
 Carl Epting Mundy, Jr. (born 1935), Commandant of the United States Marine Corps
 Bill Mundy (baseball) (1889–1958), American baseball player
 David Mundy (born 1985), Australian rules footballer
 Edward Mundy (1794–1851), American politician and judge from Michigan
 Edward Miller Mundy (1750–1822), English MP for the Derbyshire constituency and Sheriff of Derbyshire
 Edward Miller Mundy (1800–1849), English MP for the South Derbyshire constituency 
 Francis Noel Clarke Mundy (1739–1815), English poet, magistrate and Sheriff of Derbyshire
 Francis Mundy (1771–1837), English MP for the Derbyshire constituency and Sheriff of Derbyshire
 Frank Mundy (1918-2009), former NASCAR Cup Series driver
Godfrey Mundy (1804-1860), English Army officer and Lieutenant Governor of Jersey
 Harry Mundy (1915–1988), British car engine designer and motoring magazine editor
 Hilda Mundy (1912-1980), Bolivian writer, poet, journalist
 Jimmy Mundy (1907–1983), American jazz musician and composer
 Sir John Mundy (mayor) (d. 1538), English Lord Mayor of London in 1522
 John Mundy (composer) (c. 1550/1554–1630), English composer
 John Mundy (diplomat), Canadian diplomat
 John Mundy (presenter) (born 1953) British voice-over artist and former news presenter
 John Hine Mundy (1917–2004), British-American medievalist
 Josef Mundy (1935–1994), Israeli playwright
 Julie Mundy, American popular culture author and researcher
 Leo C. Mundy (1887-1944), American physician and politician
 Liza Mundy, American journalist and author
 Matt Mundy (born 1987), Australian football (soccer) player
 Meg Mundy (born 1915), American actress
 Peter Mundy (fl. 1600 – 1667), Cornish explorer and writer
Sir Rodney Mundy (1805-1884), English Royal Navy Admiral of the Fleet
 Ryan Mundy (born 1985), American football player
 Talbot Mundy (1879–1940), English writer
 William Mundy (composer) (c. 1529–1591), English Tudor composer
 William Mundy (MP) (1801–1877), English MP for the South Derbyshire constituency and Sheriff of Derbyshire
 Wrightson Mundy (c. 1712–1762), English MP for the Leicestershire constituency and Sheriff of Derbyshire

Fictional 

 Sue Mundy, a fictional character created during the American Civil War
 Mr. Mundy, the Sniper class in Team Fortress 2
 Alexander Mundy, thief working for the government in ABC television series It Takes a Thief (1968)

See also